The Woodstock Music & Art Fair was a music festival held on a 600-acre (2.4-km2) dairy farm in the rural town of Bethel, New York, from August 15 to August 18, 1969. Thirty-two acts performed during the sometimes rainy weekend in front of nearly half a million concertgoers. It is widely regarded as one of the greatest moments in popular music history and was listed on Rolling Stones "50 Moments That Changed the History of Rock and Roll".

The musical artists who performed at Woodstock and the songs that they played are listed below.

Friday, August 15 to Saturday, August 16
The first day officially began at 5:07 p.m. with Richie Havens and featured folk artists.

Richie Havens 

 Richie Havens – guitar, vocals
 Paul "Deano" Williams – guitar, vocals
 Daniel Ben Zebulon – congas
5:00 p.m. – 5:30 p.m.
 "From the Prison"
 "Get Together"
 "From the Prison" (reprise)
 "I'm a Stranger Here"
 "High Flying Bird"
 "I Can't Make It Anymore"
 "With a Little Help from My Friends" (Beatles cover)
 "Handsome Johnny"
 "Strawberry Fields Forever / Hey Jude" (Beatles covers)
 "Freedom (Motherless Child)" (improvised lyrics)

Swami Satchidananda 
6:00 p.m. – 6:15 p.m.
Swami Satchidananda gave the invocation for the festival.

Sweetwater 
 Nansi Nevins – vocals, guitar
 Fred Herrera – bass, vocals
 Alex Del Zoppo – keyboards, vocals
 Albert Moore – flute, vocals
 R.G. Carlyle – guitar, bongos, vocals
 Pete Cobain – congas
 Alan Malarowitz – drums
 August Burns – cello
6:15 p.m. – 7:00 p.m.
 "Motherless Child"
 "Look Out"
 "For Pete's Sake"
 "Day Song"
 "What's Wrong"
 "My Crystal Spider"
 "Two Worlds"
 "Why Oh Why"
 "Let the Sunshine In"
 "Oh Happy Day"

Bert Sommer 
 Bert Sommer – guitar, vocals
 Ira Stone – guitar, keyboards, harmonica
 Charlie Bilello – bass
7:15 p.m. – 7:45 p.m.
 "Jennifer"
 "The Road to Travel"
 "I Wondered Where You'd Be"
 "She's Gone"
 "Things Are Goin' My Way"
 "And When It's Over"
 "Jeanette"
 "America"
 "A Note That Read"
 "Smile"

Tim Hardin 
 Tim Hardin – vocals, guitar
 Richard Bock – cello
 Ralph Towner – guitar, piano
 Gilles Malkine – guitar
 Glen Moore – bass
 Muruga Booker – drums
8:30 p.m. – 9:15 p.m. (time disputed)
 "How Can We Hang On to a Dream?"
 "Once-Touched by Flame"
 "If I Were a Carpenter"
 "Reason to Believe"
 "You Upset the Grace of Living When You Lie"
 "Speak Like a Child"
 "Snow White Lady"
 "Blues on My Ceiling"
 "Simple Song of Freedom"
 "Misty Roses"

Ravi Shankar 
 Ravi Shankar – sitar
 Alla Rakha – tabla
 Maya Kulkarni – tambura
12:00 a.m. – 12:45 a.m. (His performance totaled over 42 minutes, partially during a rainstorm)
 "Raga Puriya-Dhanashri/Gat In Sawarital"
 "Tabla Solo In Jhaptal"
 "Raga Manj Kmahaj (AIap,  Jor, Dhun In Kaharwa Tal)"

Melanie 
 Melanie Safka – guitar, vocals
1:00 a.m. – 1:30 a.m. 
 "Close to It All"
 "Momma Momma"
 "Beautiful People"
 "Animal Crackers"
 "Mr. Tambourine Man"
 "Tuning My Guitar"
 "Birthday of the Sun"

Arlo Guthrie 
 Arlo Guthrie – vocals, guitar
 John Pilla – guitar
 Bob Arkin – bass
 Paul Motian – drums
1:45 a.m. – 2:15 a.m.
 "Coming into Los Angeles"
 "Wheel of Fortune"
 "Walkin' Down the Line"
 The Story of Moses
 "Oh Mary Don't You Weep"
 "Every Hand in the Land"
 "Amazing Grace"

Joan Baez 
 Joan Baez – vocals, guitar
 Jeffrey Shurtleff – guitar, vocals
 Richard Festinger – guitar
3:00 a.m. – 3:45 a.m.  
 "Oh Happy Day"
 "The Last Thing on My Mind"
 "I Shall Be Released"
 Story about how federal marshals took husband David Harris into custody
 "Joe Hill"
 "Sweet Sir Galahad"
 "Hickory Wind"
 "Drug Store Truck Driving Man" (duet with Jeffrey Shurtleff)
 "One Day at a Time"
 "Take Me Back to the Sweet Sunny South"
 "Warm and Tender Love"
 "Swing Low, Sweet Chariot"
 "We Shall Overcome"

Saturday, August 16 to Sunday, August 17
The day opened at 12:15 p.m. and featured some of the event's psychedelic and guitar rock headliners.

Quill 
 Dan Cole – vocals
 Jon Cole – bass, vocals
 Norman Rogers – guitar, vocals
 Phil Thayer – keyboards, saxophone, flute
 Roger North – drums
12:15 p.m. – 1:00 p.m.
 "They Live the Life"
 "That's How I Eat"
 "Driftin'"
 "Waiting for You"

Country Joe McDonald 
 Country Joe McDonald – guitar, vocals
1:20 p.m. – 1:30 p.m. (unscheduled performance; day/time disputed)
 "Janis"
 "Donovan's Reef"
 "Heartaches by the Number"
 "Ring of Fire"
 "Tennessee Stud"
 "Rockin' Round the World"
 "Flyin' High"
 "I Seen a Rocket"
 "The "Fish" Cheer/I-Feel-Like-I'm-Fixin'-to-Die Rag"
 "I-Feel-Like-I'm-Fixin'-to-Die Rag (Reprise)"

Santana 
 Carlos Santana – guitar
 Gregg Rolie – vocals, keyboards
 David Brown – bass
 Michael Shrieve – drums
 Michael Carabello – timbales, congas, percussion
 José Areas – trumpet, timbales, congas, percussion
2:00 p.m. – 2:45 p.m.
 "Waiting"
 "Evil Ways"
 "You Just Don't Care"
 "Savor"
 "Jingo"
 "Persuasion"
 "Soul Sacrifice"
 "Fried Neckbones and Some Home Fries"

John Sebastian 
 John Sebastian – guitar, vocals
3:30 p.m. – 3:55 p.m. (unscheduled performance; day/time disputed)
 "How Have You Been"
 "Rainbows All Over Your Blues"
 "I Had a Dream"
 "Darlin' Be Home Soon"
 "Younger Generation"

Keef Hartley Band 
 Keef Hartley – drums
 Miller Anderson – guitar, vocals
 Gary Thain – bass
 Jimmy Jewell – saxophone
 Henry Lowther – trumpet, violin
4:45 p.m. – 5:30 p.m.
 "Spanish Fly"
 "She's Gone"
 "Too Much Thinking"
 "Believe in You"
 "Halfbreed Medley: Sinnin' for You / Leaving Trunk / Just to Cry / Sinnin' for You"

The Incredible String Band 
 Mike Heron – vocals, guitar, piano, various instruments
 Robin Williamson – vocals, guitar, piano, violin
 Licorice McKechnie – organ, vocals
 Rose Simpson – bass, recorder, vocals, percussion
6:00 p.m. – 6:30 p.m.
 "Invocation"
 "The Letter"
 "Gather 'Round"
 "This Moment"
 "Come with Me"
 "When You Find Out Who You Are"

Canned Heat 
 Alan "Blind Owl" Wilson – guitar, harmonica, vocals
 Bob "The Bear" Hite – vocals, harmonica
 Harvey Mandel – guitar
 Larry Taylor – bass
 Adolfo "Fito" de la Parra – drums
7:30 p.m. – 8:30 p.m.
 "I'm Her Man"
 "Going Up the Country"
 "A Change Is Gonna Come / Leaving This Town"
 "Rollin' Blues"
 "Woodstock Boogie"
 "On the Road Again"

Mountain 
 Leslie West – guitar, vocals
 Felix Pappalardi – bass, vocals
 Steve Knight – keyboards
 N.D. Smart – drums
9:00 p.m. – 10:00 p.m.
 "Blood of the Sun"
 "Stormy Monday"
 "Theme for an Imaginary Western"
 "Long Red"
 "For Yasgur's Farm" (song was untitled at the time)
 "Beside the Sea"
 "Waiting to Take You Away"
 "Dreams of Milk and Honey / Guitar Solo"
 "Southbound Train"

Grateful Dead 
 Jerry Garcia – guitar, vocals
 Bob Weir – guitar, vocals
 Ron "Pigpen" McKernan – keyboards, harmonica, percussion, vocals
 Tom Constanten – keyboards
 Phil Lesh – bass, vocals
 Bill Kreutzmann – drums
 Mickey Hart – drums
10:30 p.m. – 12:05 a.m. 
 "St. Stephen"
 "Mama Tried"
 "Dark Star"
 "High Time"
 "Turn On Your Love Light"

Creedence Clearwater Revival 
 John Fogerty – vocals, guitar, harmonica, piano
 Tom Fogerty – guitar, vocals
 Stu Cook – bass
 Doug Clifford – drums
12:30 a.m. – 1:20 a.m.
 "Born on the Bayou"
 "Green River"
 "Ninety-Nine and a Half (Won't Do)"
 "Bootleg"
 "Commotion"
 "Bad Moon Rising"
 "Proud Mary"
 "I Put a Spell on You"
 "Night Time Is the Right Time"
 "Keep on Chooglin'"
 "Susie Q"

Janis Joplin and the Kozmic Blues Band 
 Janis Joplin – vocals
 Terry Clements – tenor saxophone
 Cornelius "Snooky" Flowers – baritone saxophone, vocals
 Luis Gasca – trumpet
 John Till – guitar
 Richard Kermode – keyboards
 Brad Campbell – bass
 Maury Baker – drums
2:00 a.m. – 3:00 a.m.
 "Raise Your Hand"
 "As Good as You've Been to This World"
 "To Love Somebody"
 "Summertime"
 "Try (Just a Little Bit Harder)"
 "Kozmic Blues"
 "I Can't Turn You Loose"
 "Work Me, Lord"
 "Piece of My Heart"
 "Ball and Chain"

Sly & the Family Stone 
 Sly Stone – keyboards, vocals
 Freddie Stone – guitar, vocals
 Jerry Martini – saxophone
 Cynthia Robinson – trumpet
 Rose Stone – keyboards, vocals
 Larry Graham – bass, vocals
 Gregg Errico – drums
3:30 a.m. – 4:20 a.m.
 "M'Lady"
 "Sing a Simple Song"
 "You Can Make It If You Try"
 "Everyday People" (Only No. 1 hit at Woodstock)
 "Dance to the Music"
 "Music Lover"
 "I Want to Take You Higher"
 "Love City"
 "Stand!"

The Who 
 Roger Daltrey – vocals
 Pete Townshend – guitar, vocals
 John Entwistle – bass, vocals
 Keith Moon – drums
5:00 a.m. – 6:05 a.m.; set included most of Tommy
 "Heaven and Hell"
 "I Can't Explain"
 "It's a Boy"
 "1921"
 "Amazing Journey"
 "Sparks"
 "Eyesight to the Blind (The Hawker)"
 "Christmas"
 "The Acid Queen"
 "Pinball Wizard" (followed by Abbie Hoffman incident)
 "Do You Think It's Alright?"
 "Fiddle About"
 "There's a Doctor"
 "Go to the Mirror!"
 "Smash the Mirror"
 "I'm Free"
 "Tommy's Holiday Camp"
 "We're Not Gonna Take It"
"See Me, Feel Me"
 "Summertime Blues"
 "Shakin' All Over"
 "My Generation" (shortened version)
 "Naked Eye" (instrumental finale only)

Jefferson Airplane 
 Grace Slick – vocals
 Marty Balin – vocals, percussion
 Paul Kantner – guitar, vocals
 Jorma Kaukonen – guitar, vocals
 Jack Casady – bass
 Spencer Dryden – drums
 Nicky Hopkins – piano
8:00 a.m. – 9:40 a.m.
 "The Other Side of This Life"
 "Somebody to Love"
 "3/5 of a Mile in 10 Seconds"
 "Won't You Try/Saturday Afternoon"
 "Eskimo Blue Day"
 "Plastic Fantastic Lover"
 "Wooden Ships"
 "Uncle Sam Blues"
 "Volunteers"
 "The Ballad of You and Me and Pooneil"
 "Come Back Baby"
 "White Rabbit"
 "The House at Pooneil Corners"

Sunday, August 17 to Monday, August 18
The third day was dominated by blues rock and roots rock.

Joe Cocker and the Grease Band 
 Joe Cocker – vocals
 Chris Stainton – keyboards
 Henry McCullough – guitar, vocals
 Alan Spenner – bass, vocals
 Bruce Rowland – drums
2:00 p.m. – 3:25 p.m.
 "Rockhouse" (without Joe Cocker)
 "Who Knows What Tomorrow May Bring" (instrumental)
 "Dear Landlord"
 "Something's Coming On"
 "Do I Still Figure in Your Life?"
 "Feelin' Alright"
 "Just Like a Woman"
 "Let's Go Get Stoned"
 "I Don't Need No Doctor"
 "I Shall Be Released"
 "Hitchcock Railway"
 "Something to Say"
 "With a Little Help from My Friends" (Beatles cover)

After Cocker's set, a thunderstorm disrupted the events for a few hours.

Country Joe and the Fish 
 Country Joe McDonald – vocals, guitar
 Barry "The Fish" Melton – guitar, vocals
 Mark Kapner – keyboards
 Doug Metzner – bass
 Greg Dewey – drums
6:30 p.m. – 8:00 p.m.
 "Rock & Soul Music"
 "Love"
 "Not So Sweet Martha Lorraine"
 "Sing, Sing, Sing"
 "Summer Dresses"
 "Friend, Lover, Woman, Wife"
 "Silver and Gold"
 "Maria"
 "The Love Machine"
 "Ever Since You Told Me That You Love Me (I'm a Nut)"
 "Crystal Blues"
 "Rock & Soul Music (Reprise)"
 "The "Fish" Cheer/I-Feel-Like-I'm-Fixin'-to-Die Rag"

Ten Years After 
 Alvin Lee – guitar, vocals
 Chick Churchill – keyboards
 Leo Lyons – bass
 Ric Lee – drums
8:15 p.m. – 9:15 p.m.
 "Spoonful"
 "Good Morning, Little Schoolgirl" (with two false starts)
 "Hobbit"
 "I Can't Keep from Crying Sometimes"
 "Help Me"
 "I'm Going Home"

The Band 
 Robbie Robertson – guitar, vocals
 Richard Manuel – piano, organ, vocals
 Garth Hudson – organ, piano
 Rick Danko – bass, vocals
 Levon Helm – drums, mandolin, vocals
10:00 p.m. – 10:50 p.m.
 "Chest Fever"
 "Don't Do It"
 "Tears of Rage"
 "We Can Talk"
 "Long Black Veil"
 "Don't Ya Tell Henry"
 "Ain't No More Cane"
 "This Wheel's on Fire"
 "I Shall Be Released"
 "The Weight"
 "Loving You Is Sweeter Than Ever"

Johnny Winter 
 Johnny Winter – guitar, vocals
 Tommy Shannon – bass
 Uncle John Turner – drums
 Edgar Winter – keyboards, saxophone, vocals
12:00 a.m. – 1:05 a.m.;
 "Mama, Talk to Your Daughter"
 "Leland Mississippi Blues"
 "Mean Town Blues"
 "You Done Lost Your Good Thing Now" / "Mean Mistreater"
 "I Can't Stand It" (with Edgar Winter)
 "Tobacco Road" (with Edgar Winter)
 "Tell the Truth" (with Edgar Winter)
 "Johnny B. Goode"

Blood, Sweat & Tears 
 David Clayton-Thomas – vocals, guitar
 Steve Katz – guitar, harmonica, vocals
 Dick Halligan – keyboards, trombone, flute
 Jerry Hyman – trombone
 Fred Lipsius – alto sax, piano
 Lew Soloff – trumpet, flugelhorn
 Chuck Winfield – trumpet, flugelhorn
 Jim Fielder – bass
 Bobby Colomby – drums
1:30 a.m. – 2:30 a.m.
 "More and More"
 "Just One Smile"
 "Somethin' Comin' On"
 "I Love You More Than You'll Ever Know"
 "Spinning Wheel"
 "Sometimes in Winter"
 "Smiling Phases"
 "God Bless the Child"
 "And When I Die"
 "You've Made Me So Very Happy"

Crosby, Stills, Nash & Young 
 David Crosby – guitar, vocals
 Stephen Stills – guitar, vocals
 Graham Nash – guitar, vocals
 Neil Young – guitar, keyboards, vocals
 Greg Reeves – bass
 Dallas Taylor – drums
3:00 a.m. – 4:00 a.m., with separate acoustic and electric sets.
 Acoustic Set
 "Suite: Judy Blue Eyes"
 "Blackbird" (The Beatles cover) 
 "Helplessly Hoping"
 "Guinnevere"
 "Marrakesh Express"
 "4 + 20"
 "Mr. Soul"
 "Wonderin’"
 "You Don't Have to Cry"
 Electric Set
 "Pre-Road Downs"
 "Long Time Gone"
 "Bluebird Revisited"
 "Sea of Madness"
 "Wooden Ships"
 Acoustic Encore
 "Find the Cost of Freedom"
 Electric Encore
 "49 Bye-Byes"

This was just the band's second performance together. Neil Young skipped most of the acoustic set (the exceptions being his compositions "Mr. Soul" and "Wonderin'" and the final acoustic number, Stills' "You Don't Have to Cry") and joined Crosby, Stills and Nash during the electric set, but refused to be filmed. Young felt the filming was distracting both performers and audience from the music. As a result, Young's name was dropped in the concert film and on its soundtrack (though his name is included in Chip Monck's introduction of the band in the film). Despite Young's refusal, footage does exist of him performing "Mr. Soul" and "Long Time Gone". The "Mr. Soul" performance can be found as an Easter egg on his The Archives Vol. 1 1963–1972 box set, but because of Young's resistance to being filmed, during much of the performance the camera remains focused on Stills. The version of Young's "Sea of Madness" on the Woodstock soundtrack album was actually recorded at a Fillmore East concert, one month after the festival. According to legend, Stephen Stills demanded the replacement because the Woodstock version was substandard. The original recording finally saw release on 2019's Woodstock – Back to the Garden: The Definitive 50th Anniversary Archive.

Paul Butterfield Blues Band 
 Paul Butterfield – vocals, harmonica
 Buzz Feiten – guitar
 Rod Hicks – bass
 David Sanborn – alto saxophone
 Gene Dinwiddie – tenor saxophone, vocals
 Trevor Lawrence – baritone saxophone
 Keith Johnson – trumpet
 Steve Madaio – trumpet
 Phillip Wilson – drums
6:00 a.m. – 6:45 a.m.
 "Born Under a Bad Sign"
 "No Amount of Loving"
 "Driftin' and Driftin'"
 "Morning Sunrise"
 "All in a Day"
 "Love March"
 "Everything's Gonna Be Alright"

This set was released on an album titled Paul Butterfield Live In White Lake, N.Y. 8/18/69.

Sha Na Na 
 Donny York – vocals
 Rob Leonard – vocals
 Alan Cooper – vocals
 Frederick "Dennis" Greene – vocals
 Dave Garrett – vocals
 Rich Joffe – vocals
 Scott Powell – vocals
 Joe Witkin – keyboards
 Henry Gross – guitar
 Elliot "Gino" Cahn – guitar
 Bruce "Bruno" Clarke – bass
 Jocko Marcellino – drums
7:30 a.m. – 8:00 a.m.
 "Get a Job"
 "Come Go with Me"
 "Silhouettes"
 "Teen Angel"
 "(Marie's the Name) His Latest Flame"
 "Wipe Out"
 "Book of Love"
 "Teenager in Love" (The sole song from the festival for which no recording has yet surfaced.)
 "Little Darlin'" (Only a recording of the last 44 seconds is currently known to exist.)
 "At the Hop"
 "Duke of Earl"
 "Get a Job (Reprise)"

Jimi Hendrix 
 Jimi Hendrix – guitar, vocals
 Larry Lee – guitar, vocals
 Billy Cox – bass, vocals
 Mitch Mitchell – drums
 Juma Sultan – percussion
 Gerardo Velez –  congas
9:00 a.m. – 11:10 a.m.
 "Message to Love"
 "Hear My Train A Comin'"
 "Spanish Castle Magic"
 "Red House" (Hendrix's high E-string broke while playing, but he played the rest of the song with five strings.)
 "Mastermind" (written and sung by Larry Lee. The recording has never been officially released as the Hendrix estate has prohibited it for "aesthetic reasons").
 "Lover Man" 
 "Foxy Lady"
 "Jam Back at the House"
 "Izabella"
 "Gypsy Woman"/"Aware of Love" (These two songs written by Curtis Mayfield were sung by Larry Lee as a medley. The recording has never been officially released as the Hendrix estate has prohibited it for "aesthetic reasons".)
 "Fire"
 "Voodoo Child (Slight Return)"/"Stepping Stone"
 "The Star-Spangled Banner"
 "Purple Haze"
 "Woodstock Improvisation" (title is posthumous)
 "Villanova Junction" (title is posthumous)
 "Hey Joe" (encore)

After being introduced as the Jimi Hendrix Experience, Hendrix corrected his temporary group's name to "Gypsy Sun and Rainbows, for short it's nothin' but a band of gypsies." Later during the set he introduced them as "Sky Church". The band performed with Hendrix just twice after Woodstock.

Notes

References

1969 in American music
Catskills
Concerts in the United States
Hippie movement
Music-related lists
Rock festivals in the United States
Woodstock Festival